Mount Augustus is located roughly 1,000 km north of Perth, in the Mount Augustus National Park in Western Australia.  The name is also given to the neighbouring pastoral lease, Mount Augustus Station. The local Wadjari people call it Burringurrah, after a Dreamtime figure, a young boy who was speared and turned into a rock. It has been a sacred site for thousands of years. 

Monolith–monocline distinction
Mount Augustus is widely claimed in tourist promotional and information literature as the "world's largest monolith", but the claim does not originate from the geological literature, nor is it substantiated by any other scholarly research.

Mt. Augustus is more than twice the size of Uluru. Unlike Uluru, which is a monolith and, in general, devoid of plant growth, Mt. Augustus is a monocline (an asymmetrical anticline).

1894 gold rush
There was a gold rush in the 1890s due to local geology.

Flora and fauna
Wattles, cassias and eremophilas dominate the plant life and the animal life include emus, red kangaroos, goannas, euros and birds of prey.  There are over 100 species of birds on and around Mount Augustus.

Walking tracks
The climb to the summit and back can take up to 5 hours, and there are two trails (one class 4 and the other a class 5) to get there. There are a number of walking tracks to explore.

There have been a number of deaths on the summit walking trail. An inquest into the deaths by government authorities suggests to close the summit trail between September and March for the sake of unwary hikers who do not appreciate the treacherous conditions.

Aboriginal history and rock engravings 
Evidence of early Aboriginal habitation is depicted in the rock engravings around Mount Augustus. Many of the Dreamtime stories of the local Aboriginal Wajarri people can be viewed in the rock engravings at Mundee, Ooramboo and Beedoboondu. All of these are accessible on the loop walking trail.

See also
 Gill Pinnacle

Notes

Shire of Upper Gascoyne
Inselbergs of Western Australia